Edgar Phillips (8 October 1889 – 30 August 1962), known by the bardic name "Trefin", was a Welsh poet and served as Archdruid of the National Eisteddfod of Wales from 1960 until his death.

Phillips took his bardic name from his birthplace, the village of Trefin in Pembrokeshire. He did not learn Welsh until his family moved to Cardiff when he was aged eleven. Whilst working as an apprentice tailor back in his native county, he mastered the art of cynghanedd. After running his own tailoring business in Cardiff, he joined the Royal Garrison Artillery during World War I, and was seriously wounded. In 1921 he took a teaching course at Caerleon, and taught at Pengam and Pontllanfraith. In 1933 he won the chair at the National Eisteddfod held in Wrexham.

His third wife, whom he married in 1951, was the travel writer Maxwell Fraser (real name Dorothy Phillips).

A memorial was erected within the chapel grounds of Rehoboth chapel.

Works
Trysor o gân, in four volumes (1930–36)
Caniadau Trefîn (1950)
Edmund Jones, the Old Prophet (1959)

References

Sources
Welsh Biography Online

1889 births
1962 deaths
British Army personnel of World War I
Chaired bards
Royal Garrison Artillery soldiers
Welsh-language poets
Welsh Eisteddfod archdruids
Welsh Eisteddfod winners
20th-century Welsh poets
Military personnel from Pembrokeshire